Mount Fernow is a tall peak in the North Cascades in the U.S. state of Washington and within the Glacier Peak Wilderness of the Wenatchee National Forest. At  in elevation it is the eighth-highest peak in Washington and the state's third-highest non-volcanic peak. It is also the highest peak of the Entiat Mountains, a sub-range of the Cascades. The closest peak to Fernow is Copper Peak,  to the north, and the nearest higher peak is Bonanza Peak,  to the north.

Mount Fernow is flanked by several glaciers. Other large glaciated peaks are nearby, such as Seven Fingered Jack to the south. The headwaters of the Entiat River rise from the south slopes of Mount Fernow and the east slopes of Seven Fingered Jack.

History
Mount Fernow was named by Albert H. Sylvester in honor of Bernhard Fernow, a German forester who moved to the United States and worked for the Division of Forestry in the United States Department of Agriculture in the late 19th century.

Mount Fernow was first summited in 1932 by a party including Oscar Pennington and Hermann Ulrichs.

A small unnamed lake sits on the northwestern slopes of Fernow. Travelling here requires crossing loose boulder fields.

See also
List of highest mountain peaks in Washington
Mount Fernow (King County, Washington)

References

External links
 

Mountains of Washington (state)
North Cascades of Washington (state)
Mountains of Chelan County, Washington